Norman Lang may refer to:

 Norman Lang (politician) (1887–1930), farmer, rancher and political figure in Saskatchewan, Canada
 Norman Lang (bishop) (1875–1956), Suffragan Bishop of Leicester, 1913–1927